The Twenty-First Legislature of the Territory of Hawaii was a session of the Hawaii Territorial Legislature.  The session convened in Honolulu, Hawaii, and ran from February 20 until April 30, 1941.  It was the final legislative session convened prior to the Attack on Pearl Harbor.

Legislative session
The session ran from February 20 until April 30, 1941. It passed 334 bills into law.

A special session ran from September 15 until November 1, 1941. It passed 98 bills into law.

Act 19 (House Bill No. 58), signed by Governor Joseph Poindexter on April 11, 1941, made it a misdemeanor to label, advertise or offer for sale coffee as Hawaiian or Kona Coffee unless one hundred percent of such coffee was raised in the Territory. The penalty included a fine of not more than $1,000 (around $20,000 in 2022), and/or not more than one year imprisonment.

Senators

House of Representatives

References

Notes

Hawaii legislative sessions
1941 in Hawaii